Ivica Solomun (born 29 January 1968) is a retired Croatian football midfielder and manager. He is the most capped goalkeeper in the Croatian First Football League.

He scored a goal for Varteks Varaždin from a penalty against HNK Vukovar '91 in February 2000.

References

1968 births
Living people
People from Sisak-Moslavina County
Association football goalkeepers
Croatian footballers
NK Varaždin players
NK Belišće players
NK Slaven Belupo players
Croatian Football League players
Croatian football managers
Croatian expatriate football managers
Expatriate football managers in Slovenia
Croatian expatriate sportspeople in Slovenia